Tanu Khan is an Indian television actress. She is best known for her portrayal of Empress Helena Maurya in the tv series  Chandra Nandini and Mishika in Yeh Hai Chahatein.

Career
She was in the tv show Chandra Nandini as Empress Helena Maurya with Shweta Basu Prasad. In 2019, she began playing the role of Mishka Singhania in Yeh Hai Chahatein

Filmography

Television

References

Living people
Indian television actresses
Indian soap opera actresses
Actresses in Hindi television
21st-century Indian actresses
Year of birth missing (living people)